The economy of Cuba is a mixed command economy dominated by state-run enterprises. Most of the labor force is employed by the state. In the 1990s, the ruling Communist Party of Cuba encouraged the formation of worker co-operatives and self-employment. In the late 2010s, private property and free-market rights along with foreign direct investment were granted by the 2018 Cuban constitution. Foreign direct investment in various Cuban economic sectors increased before 2018. , public-sector employment was 76%, and private-sector employment (mainly composed of self-employment) was 23%, compared to the 1981 ratio of 91% to 8%. Investment is restricted and requires approval by the government. In 2019, Cuba ranked 70th out of 189 countries on the Human Development Index in the high human development category. , the country's public debt comprised 35.3% of GDP, inflation (CDP) was 5.5%, and GDP growth was 3%. Housing and transportation costs are low. Cubans receive government-subsidized education, healthcare, and food subsidies.

At the time of the Cuban Revolution of 1953–1959, during the military dictatorship regime of Fulgencio Batista, Cuba's GDP per capita was ranked 7th in the 47 economies of Latin America. Its income distribution compared favorably with that of other Latin American countries. However, "available data must be viewed cautiously and assumed to portray merely a rough approximation of conditions at the time," according to Susan Eckstein. However, there were profound social inequalities between city and countryside and between whites and blacks, and Cuba had a trade and unemployment problem. According to the American PBS program American Experience, "[o]n the eve of Fidel Castro's 1959 revolution, Cuba was neither the paradise that would later be conjured by the nostalgic imaginations of Cuba's many exiles nor the hellhole painted by many supporters of the revolution." The socialist revolution was followed by the ongoing United States embargo against Cuba, described by William M. LeoGrande as "the oldest and most comprehensive US economic sanctions regime against any country in the world." In its 2020 report to the United Nations, Cuba stated that the total cost to Cuba from the United States embargo is $144 billion since its inception.

Between 1970 and 1985, Cuba experienced high-sustained rates of growth; according to Claes Brundenius, "Cuba had done remarkably well in terms of satisfying basic needs (especially education and health)" and "was actually following the World Bank recipe from the 1970s: redistribution with growth". During the Cold War, the Cuban economy was heavily dependent on subsidies from the Soviet Union, valued at $65 billion in total from 1960 to 1990 (over three times as the entirety of U.S. economic aid to Latin America through the Alliance for Progress), an average of $2.17 billion a year. This accounted for between 10% and 40% of Cuban GDP, depending on the year. While the massive Soviet subsidies enabled Cuba's enormous state budget, they did not lead to a more advanced or sustainable Cuban economy. Described by economists as "a relatively highly developed Latin American export economy" in 1959 and the early 1960s, Cuba's fundamental economic structure changed very little between then and 1990. Tobacco products such as cigars and cigarettes were the only manufactured products among Cuba's leading exports, and a pre-industrial process produced even these. The Cuban economy remained inefficient and over-specialized in a few highly subsidized commodities provided by the Eastern Bloc countries. Following the fall of the Soviet Union, Cuba's GDP declined by 33% between 1990 and 1993, partially due to the loss of Soviet subsidies and a crash in sugar prices in the early 1990s. This period of economic stagnation and decline is known as the Special Period. Cuba's economy rebounded in the early 2000s due to a combination of marginal liberalization of the economy and heavy subsidies from the government of Venezuela, which provided Cuba with low-cost oil and other subsidies worth up to 12% of Cuban GDP annually.

History

Before the Revolution 
Although Cuba belonged to the high-income countries of Latin America since the 1870s, income inequality was high, accompanied by capital outflows to foreign investors. The country's economy had grown rapidly in the early part of the century, fueled by the sale of sugar to the United States.

Before the Cuban Revolution, in 1958, Cuba had a per-capita GDP of $2,363, which placed it in the middle of Latin American countries. According to the UN, between 1950 and 1955, Cuba had a life expectancy of 59.4 years, which placed it in 56th place in the global ranking.

Its proximity to the United States made it a familiar holiday destination for wealthy Americans. Their visits for gambling, horse racing, and golfing made tourism an important economic sector. Tourism magazine Cabaret Quarterly described Havana as "a mistress of pleasure, the lush and opulent goddess of delights". Cuban dictator Fulgencio Batista had plans to line the Malecon, Havana's famous walkway by the water, with hotels and casinos to attract even more tourists. Today Hotel Havana Riviera is the only hotel built before the revolutionary government took control.

Cuban Revolution
On 3 March 1959, Fidel Castro seized control of the Cuban Telephone Company, which was a subsidiary of the International Telephone and Telecommunications Corporation. This was the first of many nationalizations made by the new government; the assets seized totaled US$9 billion.

After the 1959 Revolution, citizens were not required to pay a personal income tax (their salaries being regarded as net of any taxes). The government also began to subsidize healthcare and education for all citizens; this action created strong national support for the new revolutionary government.

After the USSR and Cuba reestablished their diplomatic relations in May 1960, the USSR began to buy Cuban sugar in exchange for oil. When oil refineries like Shell, Texaco, and Esso refused to refine Soviet oil, Castro nationalized that industry as well, taking over the refineries on the island. Days later in response, the United States cut the Cuban sugar quota completely; Eisenhower was quoted saying "This action amounts to economic sanctions against Cuba. Now we must look ahead to other economic, diplomatic, and strategic moves." On 7 February 1962, Kennedy expanded the United States embargo to cover almost all U.S. imports.

By the late 1960s, Cuba became dependent on Soviet economic, political, and military aid. It was also around this time that Castro began privately believing that Cuba could bypass the various stages of socialism and progress directly to pure communism. General Secretary Leonid Brezhnev consolidated Cuba's dependence on the USSR when, in 1973, Castro caved to Brezhnev's pressure to become a full member of CEMA.

In 1970, Fidel Castro attempted to motivate the Cuban people to harvest 10 million tons of sugar, in Spanish known as La Zafra, to increase their exports and grow their economy. Despite the help of most of the Cuban population, the country fell short and produced only 7.56 million tons. In July 1970, after the harvest was over, Castro took responsibility for the failure, but later that same year, shifted the blame toward the Sugar Industry Minister saying "Those technocrats, geniuses, super-scientists assured me that they knew what to do to produce the ten million tons. But it was proven, first, that they did not know how to do it and, second, that they exploited the rest of the economy by receiving large amounts of resources ... while there are factories that could have improved with a better distribution of those resources that were allocated to the Ten-Million-Ton plan".

During the Revolutionary period, Cuba was one of the few developing countries to provide foreign aid to other countries. Foreign aid began with the construction of six hospitals in Peru in the early 1970s. It expanded later in the 1970s to the point where some 8000 Cubans worked in overseas assignments. Cubans built housing, roads, airports, schools, and other facilities in Angola, Ethiopia, Laos, Guinea, Tanzania, and other countries. By the end of 1985, 35,000 Cuban workers had helped build projects in some 20 Asian, African, and Latin American countries.

For Nicaragua in 1982, Cuba pledged to provide over $130 million worth of agricultural and machinery equipment and some 4000 technicians, doctors, and teachers.

In 1986, Cuba defaulted on its $10.9 billion debt to the Paris Club. In 1987, Cuba stopped making payments on that debt. In 2002, Cuba defaulted on $750 million in Japanese loans.

Special Period

The Cuban gross domestic product declined at least 35% between 1989 and 1993 due to the loss of 80% of its trading partners and Soviet subsidies. This loss of subsidies coincided with a collapse in world sugar prices. Sugar had done well from 1985 to 1990, crashed precipitously in 1990 and 1991 and did not recover for five years. Cuba had been insulated from world sugar prices by Soviet price guarantees. However, the Cuban economy began to improve again following a rapid improvement in trade and diplomatic relations between Cuba and Venezuela following the election of Hugo Chávez in Venezuela in 1998, who became Cuba's most important trading partner and diplomacy ally.

This era was referred to as the "Special Period in Peacetime", later shortened to "Special Period". A Canadian Medical Association Journal paper claimed, "The famine in Cuba during the Special Period was caused by political and economic factors similar to the ones that caused a famine in North Korea in the mid-1990s because both countries were run by authoritarian regimes that denied ordinary people the food to which they were entitled to when the public food distribution collapsed and priority was given to the elite classes and the military." Other reports painted an equally dismal picture, describing Cubans having to resort to eating anything they could find, from Havana Zoo animals to domestic cats. But although the collapse of centrally planned economies in the Soviet Union and other countries of the Eastern bloc subjected Cuba to severe economic difficulties, which led to a drop in calories per day from 3052 in 1989 to 2600 in 2006, mortality rates were not strongly affected thanks to the priority given on maintaining a social safety net.

Reforms and recovery

The government undertook several reforms to stem excess liquidity, increase labor incentives, and alleviate serious shortages of food, consumer goods, and services. To alleviate the economic crisis, the government introduced a few market-oriented reforms, including opening to tourism, allowing foreign investment, legalizing the U.S. dollar, and authorizing self-employment for some 150 occupations. (This policy was later partially reversed so that while the U.S. dollar is no longer accepted in businesses, it remains legal for Cubans to hold the currency.) These measures resulted in modest economic growth. The liberalized agricultural markets were introduced in October 1994, at which state and private farmers sell above-quota production at free market prices, broadened legal consumption alternatives, and reduced black market prices.

Government efforts to lower subsidies to unprofitable enterprises and to shrink the money supply caused the semi-official exchange rate for the Cuban peso to move from a peak of 120 to the dollar in the summer of 1994 to 21 to the dollar by year-end 1999. The drop in GDP halted in 1994 when Cuba reported 0.7% growth, followed by increases of 2.5% in 1995 and 7.8% in 1996. Growth slowed again in 1997 and 1998 to 2.5% and 1.2% respectively. One of the key reasons was the failure to notice that sugar production had become uneconomic. Reflecting on the Special Period, Cuban president Fidel Castro later admitted that many mistakes had been made, "The country had many economists, and it is not my intention to criticize them, but I would like to ask why we hadn't discovered earlier that maintaining our levels of sugar production would be impossible. The Soviet Union collapsed, oil cost $40 a barrel, and sugar prices were at basement levels, so why did we not rationalize the industry?" Living conditions in 1999 remained well below the 1989 level.

Due to the continued growth of tourism, growth began in 1999 with a 6.2% increase in GDP. Growth then picked up, with a growth in GDP of 11.8% in 2005 according to government figures. In 2007 the Cuban economy grew by 7.5%, higher than the Latin American average. Accordingly, the cumulative growth in GDP since 2004 stood at 42.5%.

However, starting in 1996, the government imposed income taxes on self-employed Cubans.
Cuba ranked third in the region in 1958 in GDP per capita, surpassed only by Venezuela and Uruguay. It had descended to 9th, 11th, or 12th place in the region by 2007. Cuban social indicators suffered less.

Every year the United Nations holds a vote asking countries to choose if the United States is justified in its economic embargo against Cuba and whether it should be lifted. 2016 was the first year that the United States abstained from the vote, rather than voting no, "since 1992 the US and Israel have constantly voted against the resolution – occasionally supported by the Marshall Islands, Palau, Uzbekistan, Albania and Romania".

Post-Fidel Castro reforms 

In 2011, "[t]he new economic reforms were introduced, effectively creating a new economic system", which the Brookings Institution dubbed the "New Cuban Economy". Since then, over 400,000 Cubans have signed up to become entrepreneurs.  the government listed 181 official jobs no longer under their control—such as taxi driver, construction worker and shopkeeper. Workers must purchase licenses to work for some roles, such as a mule driver, palm-tree trimmer, or well digger. Despite these openings, Cuba maintains nationalized companies for the distribution of all essential amenities (water, power, etc.) and other essential services to ensure a healthy population (education, health care).

Around 2000, half the country's sugar mills closed. Before reforms, imports were double exports, doctors earned £15 per month, and families supplemented incomes with extra jobs. After reforms, more than 150,000 farmers could lease land from the government for surplus crop production. Before the reforms, the only real estate transactions involved homeowners swapping properties; reforms legalized the buying and selling of real estate and created a real estate boom in the country. In 2012 a Havana fast-food burger/pizza restaurant, La Pachanga, started in the owner's home;  it served 1,000 meals on a Saturday at £3 each. Tourists can now ride factory steam locomotives through closed sugar mills.

In 2008, Raúl Castro's administration hinted that the purchase of computers, DVD players, and microwaves would become legal; however, monthly wages remain less than 20 U.S. dollars. Mobile phones, which had been restricted to Cubans working for foreign companies and government officials, were legalized in 2008.

In 2010 Fidel Castro, in agreement with Raúl Castro's reformist sentiment, admitted that the Cuban model based on the old Soviet centralized planning model was no longer sustainable. The brothers encouraged the development of a cooperative variant of socialism - where the state plays a less active role in the economy - and the formation of worker-owned co-operatives and self-employment enterprises.

To remedy Cuba's economic structural distortions and inefficiencies, the Sixth Congress approved an expansion of the internal market and access to global markets on 18 April 2011. A comprehensive list of changes is:
 expenditure adjustments (education, healthcare, sports, culture)  
 change in the structure of employment; reducing inflated payrolls and increasing work in the non-state sector  
 legalizing 201 different personal business licenses 
 fallow state land in usufruct leased to residents
 incentives for non-state employment, as a re-launch of self-employment
 proposals for the formation of non-agricultural cooperatives 
 legalization of the sale and private ownership of homes and cars  
 greater autonomy for state firms  
 search for food self-sufficiency, the gradual elimination of universal rationing and change to targeting the poorest population 
 possibility to rent state-run enterprises (including state restaurants) to self-employed persons
 separation of state and business functions  
 tax-policy update  
 easier travel for Cubans 
 strategies for external debt restructuring

On 20 December 2011, a new credit policy allowed Cuban banks to finance entrepreneurs and individuals wishing to make major purchases to make home improvements in addition to farmers. "Cuban banks have long provided loans to farm cooperatives, they have offered credit to new recipients of farmland in usufruct since 2008, and in 2011 they began making loans to individuals for business and other purposes".

The system of rationed food distribution in Cuba was known as the Libreta de Abastecimiento ("Supplies booklet").  ration books at bodegas still procured rice, oil, sugar, and matches above the government average wage of £15 monthly.

Raul Castro signed Law 313 in September 2013 to set up a special economic zone, the first in the country, in the port city of Mariel.

On 22 October 2013, the government eventually announced its intention to end the dual-currency system. The convertible peso (CUC) was no longer issued from 1 January 2021 and ceased circulation on 30 December 2021.

The achievements of the radical social policy of socialist Cuba, which enabled social advancement for the formerly underprivileged classes, were curbed by the economic crisis and the low wages of recent decades. The socialist leadership is reluctant to tackle this problem because it touches a core aspect of its revolutionary legitimacy. As a result, Cuba's National Bureau of Statistics (ONE) publishes little data on the growing socio-economic divide. A nationwide scientific survey shows that social inequalities have become increasingly visible in everyday life and that the Afro-Cuban population is structurally disadvantaged. The report notes that while 58 percent of white Cubans have incomes of less than $3,000 a year, that proportion reaches 95 percent among Afro-Cubans. Afro-Cubans, moreover, receive a very limited portion of family remittances from the Cuban-American community in South Florida, which is mostly white. Remittances from family members from abroad serve often as starting capital for the emerging private sector. The most lucrative branches of business, such as restaurants and lodgings, are run by white people in particular.

In February 2019, Cuban voters approved a new constitution granting the right to private property and greater access to free markets while also maintaining Cuba's status as a socialist state. In June 2019, the 16th ExpoCaribe trade fair took place in Santiago. Since 2014, the Cuban economy has seen a dramatic uptick in foreign investment. In November 2019, Cuba's state newspaper, Granma, published an article acknowledging that despite the deterioration in relations between the U.S. and Cuban governments, the Cuban government continued to make efforts to attract foreign investment in 2018. In December 2018, 525 foreign direct investment projects were reported in Cuba, a dramatic increase from the 246 projects reported in 2014.

In February 2021, the Cuban Cabinet authorized private initiatives in more than 1800 occupations.

International debt negotiations
Raul Castro's government began a concerted effort to restructure and to ask for forgiveness of loans and debts with creditor countries, many in the billions of dollars and long in arrears from loans and debts incurred under Fidel Castro in the 1970s and 1980s.

In 2011, China forgave $6 billion in debt owed to it by Cuba.

In 2013, Mexico's Finance Minister Luis Videgaray announced a loan issued by Mexico's foreign trade development bank Bancomext to Cuba more than 15 years prior was worth $487 million. The governments agreed to "waive" 70% of it, approximately $340.9 million. Cuba would repay the remaining $146.1 million over ten years.

In 2014, before making a diplomatic visit to Cuba, Russian President Vladimir Putin forgave over 90% of the debt owed to Russia by Cuba. The forgiveness totaled $32 billion. A remaining $3.2 billion would be paid over ten years.

In 2015, Cuba entered into negotiations over its $11.1 billion debt to 14 members of the Paris Club. In December 2015, the parties announced an agreement - Paris Club nations agreed to forgive $8.5 billion of the $11.1 billion total debt, mostly by waiving interest, service charges, and penalties accrued over the more than two decades of non-payment. The 14 countries party to the agreement were: Austria, Australia, Belgium, Canada, Denmark, Finland, France, Italy, Japan, Spain, Sweden, Switzerland, the Netherlands, and the United Kingdom. The payment for the remaining $2.6 billion would be made over 18 years, with annual payments due by 31 October of every year. The payments would phase in gradually, increasing from an initial 1.6 percent of the total owed until the last payment of 8.9 percent in 2033. Interest would be forgiven from 2015 to 2020, and just 1.5 percent of the total debt still be due thereafter. The agreement contained a penalty clause: should Cuba again not make payments on schedule (by 31 October of any year), it would be charged 9 percent interest until payment and late interest on the portion in arrears. The regime viewed the agreement favorably to resolve the long-standing issues and build business confidence, increasing direct foreign investment and as a preliminary step to gaining access to credit lines in Europe.

In 2018, during a diplomatic visit to Cuba, the General Secretary of the Communist Party of Vietnam Nguyễn Phú Trọng wrote off Cuba's official debt to Vietnam. The forgiveness totaled $143.7 million.

In 2019, Cuba once again defaulted on its Paris Club debt. Of the estimated payment due in 2019 of $80 million, Cuba made only a partial payment that left $30 million owed for that year. Cuban Deputy Prime Minister Ricardo Cabrisas wrote a letter to Odile Renaud-Basso, president of the Paris Club, noting that Cuba was aware that "circumstances dictated that we were not able to honour our commitments with certain creditor countries as agreed in the multilateral Minute signed by the parties in December 2015". He maintained that they had "the intention of settling" the payments in arrears by 31 May 2020.

In May 2020, with payments still not made, Deputy PM Cabrisas sent a letter to the fourteen Paris Club countries in the agreement requesting "a moratorium (of payments) for 2019, 2020 and 2021 and a return to paying in 2022".

Sectors

Energy production
As of 2011, 96% of electricity was produced from fossil fuels. Solar panels were introduced in some rural areas to reduce blackouts, brownouts, and the use of kerosene. Citizens were encouraged to swap inefficient lamps with newer models to reduce consumption. A power tariff reduced inefficient use.

As of August 2012, off-shore petroleum exploration of promising formations in the Gulf of Mexico had been unproductive, with two failures reported. Additional exploration is planned.

In 2007, Cuba produced an estimated 16.89 billion kWh of electricity and consumed 13.93 billion kWh with no exports or imports. In a 1998 estimate, 89.52% of its energy production is a fossil fuel, 0.65% is hydroelectric, and 9.83% is another production. In both 2007 and 2008 estimates, the country produced 62,100 bbl/d of oil and consumed 176,000 bbl/d with 104,800 bbl/d of imports, as well as 197,300,000 bbl proved reserves of oil. Venezuela is Cuba's primary source of oil.

In 2017, Cuba produced and consumed an estimated 1189 million m3 of natural gas, with no m3 of exports or imports and 70.79 billion m3 of proved reserves.

Energy sector
The Energy Revolution is a program executed by Cuba in 2006. This program focused on developing the country's socioeconomic status and transitioning Cuba into an energy-efficient economy with diverse energy resources. Cuba's energy sector lacks the resources to produce optimal amounts of power. One of the issues the Energy Revolution program faces comes from Cuba's power production suffering from the absence of investment and the ongoing trade sanctions imposed by the United States. Likewise, the energy sector has received a multimillion-dollar investment distributed among a network of power resources. However, customers are experiencing rolling blackouts of power from energy companies to preserve electricity during Cuba's economic crisis. Furthermore, an outdated electricity grid that's been damaged by hurricanes caused the energy crisis in 2004 and continued to be a major issue during the Energy Revolution. Cuba responded to this situation by providing a variety of different types of energy resources. 6000 small diesel generators, 416 fuel oil generators, 893 diesel generators, 9.4 million incandescent bulbs for energy-saving lamps, 1.33 million fans, 5.5 million electric pressure cookers, 3.4 million electric rice cookers, 0.2 million electric water pumps, 2.04 million domestic refrigerators and 0.1 million televisions were distributed among territories. The electrical grid was restored to only 90% until 2009. Alternative energy has become a major priority as the government has promoted wind and solar power. The crucial challenge the Energy Revolution program will face is developing sustainable energy in Cuba but, take into account a country that's continuing to develop, an economic sanction and the detrimental effects of hurricanes that hit this country.

Agriculture

Cuba produces sugarcane, tobacco, citrus, coffee, rice, potatoes, beans, and livestock. As of 2015, Cuba imported about 70–80% of its food and 80–84% of the food it rations to the public. Raúl Castro ridiculed the bureaucracy that shackled the agriculture sector.

Industry

Industrial production accounted for almost 37% of Cuban GDP or US$6.9 billion and employed 24% of the population, or 2,671,000 people, in 1996. A rally in sugar prices in 2009 stimulated investment and development of sugar processing.

In 2003 Cuba's biotechnology and pharmaceutical industry was gaining in importance. Among the products sold internationally are vaccines against various viral and bacterial pathogens. For example, the drug Heberprot-P was developed as a cure for diabetic foot ulcer and had success in many developing countries. Cuba has also done pioneering work on the development of drugs for cancer treatment.

Scientists such as V. Verez-Bencomo were awarded international prizes for their biotechnology and sugar cane contributions.

Services

Tourism 

In the mid-1990s, tourism surpassed sugar, the mainstay of the Cuban economy, as the primary source of foreign exchange. Havana devotes significant resources to building tourist facilities and renovating historic structures. Cuban officials estimate roughly 1.6 million tourists visited Cuba in 1999, yielding about $1.9 billion in gross revenues. In 2000, 1,773,986 foreign visitors arrived in Cuba. Revenue from tourism reached US$1.7 billion. By 2012, some 3 million visitors brought nearly £2 billion yearly.

The growth of tourism has had social and economic repercussions. This led to speculation of the emergence of a two-tier economy and the fostering of a state of tourist apartheid. This situation was exacerbated by the influx of dollars during the 1990s, potentially creating a dual economy based on the dollar (the currency of tourists) on the one hand and the peso on the other. Scarce imported goods – and even some local manufactures, such as rum and coffee – could be had at dollar-only stores but were hard to find or unavailable at peso prices. As a result, Cubans who earned only in the peso economy, outside the tourist sector, were at a disadvantage. Those with dollar incomes based upon the service industry began to live more comfortably. This widened the gap between Cubans' material living standards, conflicting with the Cuban government's long-term socialist policies.

Retail
Cuba has a small retail sector. A few large shopping centers operated in Havana as of September 2012 but charged US prices. Pre-Revolutionary commercial districts were largely shut down. Most stores are small dollar stores, bodegas, agro-mercados (farmers' markets), and street stands.

Finance
The financial sector remains heavily regulated, and access to credit for entrepreneurial activity is seriously impeded by the shallowness of the financial market.

Foreign investment and trade
The Netherlands receives the largest share of Cuban exports (24%), 70 to 80% of which go through Indiana Finance BV, a company owned by the Van 't Wout family, who have close personal ties with Fidel Castro. This trend can be seen in other colonial Caribbean communities with direct political ties with the global economy. Cuba's primary import partner is Venezuela. The second-largest trade partner is Canada, with a 22% share of the Cuban export market.

Cuba began courting foreign investment in the Special Period. Foreign investors must form joint ventures with the Cuban government. The sole exception to this rule is Venezuelans, who can hold 100% ownership in businesses due to an agreement between Cuba and Venezuela. Cuban officials said in early 1998 that 332 joint ventures had begun. Many of these are loans or contracts for management, supplies, or services normally not considered equity investments in Western economies. Investors are constrained by the U.S.-Cuban Liberty and Democratic Solidarity Act that provides sanctions for those who traffic in property expropriated from U.S. citizens.

Cuba's average tariff rate is 10 percent. As of 2014, the country's planned economy deterred foreign trade and investment. At this point, the state maintained strict capital and exchange controls. In 2017, however, the country reported a record 2 billion in foreign investment. It was also reported that foreign investment in Cuba had increased dramatically since 2014. In September 2019, EU foreign policy chief Federica Mogherini stated during a three-day visit to Cuba that the European Union is committed to helping Cuba develop its economy

Currencies

From 1994 until 2021, Cuba had two official currencies: the national peso (or CUP) and the convertible peso (or CUC, often called "dollar" in the spoken language). In January 2021, however, a long-awaited process of currency unification began, with Cuban citizens being given six months to exchange their remaining CUCs at a rate of one to every 24 CUPs.

In 1994 the possession and use of US dollars were legalized, and by 2004 the US dollar was in widespread use in the country. To capture the hard currency flowing into the island through tourism and remittances – estimated at $500–800 million annually – the government set up state-run "dollar stores" throughout Cuba that sold "luxury" food, household, and clothing items, compared with necessities, which could be bought using national pesos. As such, the standard of living diverged between those with access to dollars and those without. Jobs that could earn dollar salaries or tips from foreign businesses and tourists became highly desirable. Meeting doctors, engineers, scientists, and other professionals working in restaurants or as taxicab drivers was common.

However, in response to stricter economic sanctions by the US and because the authorities were pleased with Cuba's economic recovery, the Cuban government decided in October 2004 to remove US dollars from circulation. In its place, the convertible peso was created, which, although not internationally traded, had a value pegged to the US dollar 1:1. A 10% surcharge was levied for cash conversions from US dollars to the convertible peso, which did not apply to other currencies, thus acting as an encouragement for tourists to bring currencies such as euros, pounds sterling or Canadian dollars into Cuba. An increasing number of tourist zones accept Euros.

Private businesses
Owners of small private restaurants (paladares) originally could seat no more than 12 people and can only employ family members. Set monthly fees must be paid regardless of income earned, and frequent inspections yield stiff fines when any of the many self-employment regulations are violated.

As of 2012, more than 150,000 farmers had signed up to lease land from the government for bonus crops. Before, homeowners were only allowed to swap; once buying and selling were allowed, prices rose.

In cities, "urban agriculture" farms small parcels. Growing organopónicos (organic gardens) in the private sector has been attractive to city-dwelling small producers who sell their products where they produce them, avoiding taxes and enjoying a measure of government help from the Ministry of Agriculture (MINAGRI) in the form of seed houses and advisers.

Wages, development, and pensions
Until June 2019, typical wages ranged from 400 non-convertible Cuban pesos a month, for a factory worker, to 700 per month for a doctor, or around 17–30 US dollars per month. However, the Human Development Index of Cuba still ranks much higher than the vast majority of Latin American nations. After Cuba lost Soviet subsidies in 1991, malnutrition resulted in an outbreak of diseases. Despite this, the poverty level reported by the government is one of the lowest in the developing world, ranking 6th out of 108 countries, 4th in Latin America and 48th among all countries. Pensions are among the smallest in the Americas at $9.50/month. In 2009, Raúl Castro increased minimum pensions by 2 dollars, which he said was to recompense for those who have "dedicated a great part of their lives to working ... and who remain firm in defense of socialism". 
Cuba is known for its system of food distribution, the Libreta de Abastecimiento ("Supplies booklet"). The system establishes the rations each person can buy through that system and the frequency of supplies. Despite rumors of ending, the system still exists.

In June 2019, the government announced an increase in public sector wages, especially for teachers and health personnel. The increase was about 300%. In October, the government opened stores where citizens could purchase, via international currencies (USD, euro, etc.) stored on electronic cards, household supplies, and similar goods. These funds are provided by remittances from emigres. The government leaders recognized that the new measure was unpopular but necessary to contain the flight of capital to other countries, such as Panama, where Cuban citizens traveled and imported items to resell on the island.

On 1 January 2021, the government launched the "Tarea Ordenamiento" (Ordering Task), previously announced on national television by President Miguel Díaz Canel and Gen. Raúl Castro, the then-first secretary of the Cuban Communist Party. This is an effort, years in the making, to end the use of the Cuban convertible peso (CUC) and to solely use the Cuban peso (CUP), ostensibly to increase economic efficiency. In February, the government created new restrictions to the private sector, with prohibitions on 124 activities, in areas like national security, health, and educational services. Wages and pensions were increased again, between 4 and 9 times, for all the sectors. For example, a university instructor's salary went from 1500 to 5500 CUP. Additionally, the dollar price was maintained by the Cuban central bank at 24 CUP, but was unable to sell dollars to the population due to the drought of foreign currency created by the COVID-19 pandemic.

Public facilities
 Bodegas Local shops offering basic products such as rice, sugar, salt, beans, cooking oil, matches, rum at low prices.
 El coppelia A government-owned facility offering ice cream, juice and sweets.
 Paladar A small, privately owned restaurant facility.
 La farmacia Low-priced medicine, with the lowest costs anywhere in the world.
 ETECSA National telephone service provider.
 La feria A weekly market (Sunday market-type) owned by the government.
 Cervecería Bucanero A beverage manufacturer providing both alcoholic and non-alcoholic beverages.
 Ciego Montero The main soft-drink and beverage distributor.

Connection with Venezuela
Cuba and Venezuela have agreements under which Venezuela provides cheap oil in exchange for the assistance of Cuban doctors in the Venezuelan health care system. As of 2015, Cuba had the third-highest number of physicians per capita worldwide (behind Monaco and Qatar) The country sends tens of thousands of doctors to other countries as aid, and to obtain favorable trade terms. According to Carmelo Mesa-Lago, a Cuban-born US economist, in nominal terms, the Venezuelan subsidy is higher than the subsidy which the Soviet Union gave to Cuba, with the Cuban state receiving cheap oil and the Cuban economy receiving around $6 billion annually. In 2013 Carmelo Mesa-Lago said, "If this help stops, industry is paralysed, transportation is paralysed and you'll see the effects in everything from electricity to sugar mills".

From an economic standpoint, Cuba relies much more on Venezuela than Venezuela does on Cuba. As of 2012, Venezuela accounted for 20.8% of Cuba's GDP, while Cuba only accounted for roughly 4% of Venezuela's. Because of this reliance, the most recent economic crisis in Venezuela, with inflation nearing 800% and GDP shrinking by 19% in 2016, Cuba is not receiving their amount of payment and heavily subsidized oil. Further budget cuts are in the plans for 2018, marking a third straight year.

Economic freedom
In 2021, Cuba's economic freedom score from the free-market oriented Heritage Foundation was 28.1, ranking Cuba's economy 176th (among the "least free") on such measures as trade freedom, fiscal freedom, monetary freedom, freedom, and business freedom. Cuba ranked 31st among the 32 South and Central America countries, with the Heritage Foundation rating Venezuela as a "client state" of Cuba's and one of the least free.

In February 2021, the government promulgated new measures to the private sector, with 124 activities remaining restricted, in areas like national security, health, and educational services.

Taxes and revenues 
As of 2009, Cuba had $47.08 billion in revenues and $50.34 billion in expenditures, with 34.6% of GDP in public debt, an account balance of $513 million, and $4.647 billion in reserves of foreign exchange and gold. Government spending is around 67 percent of GDP, and public debt is around 35 percent of the domestic economy. Despite reforms, the government plays a large role in the economy.

The top individual income tax rate is 50 percent. The top corporate tax rate is 30 percent (35 percent for wholly foreign-owned companies). Other taxes include a tax on property transfers and a sales tax. The overall tax burden is 24.42 percent of GDP.

See also

References

Citations

Sources

External links
 Cuba's Economic Struggles from the Dean Peter Krogh Foreign Affairs Digital Archives
  The Road not taken: Pre-Revolutionary Cuban Living Standards in Comparative Perspective, Marianne Ward (Loyola College) and John Devereux (Queens College CUNY)
 Archibold, Randal. Inequality Becomes More Visible in Cuba as the Economy Shifts (February 2015), The New York Times
 Cave, Danien. "Raúl Castro Thanks U.S., but Reaffirms Communist Rule in Cuba". (December 2014), The New York Times. "Mr. Castro prioritized economics. He acknowledged that Cuban state workers needed better salaries and said Cuba would accelerate economic changes in the coming year, including an end to its dual-currency system. But he said the changes needed to be gradual to create a system of 'prosperous and sustainable communism.
 Centro de Estudios de la Economía Cubana

 
Cuba